Paul Bettex (born 29 July 1892; died 6 June 1942) was a Swiss footballer who played for FC Basel. He played mainly in the position as defender, but also as midfielder. 

Between the years 1912 and 1918 Bettex played a total of 27 games for Basel but without scoring a goal. 19 of these games were in the Swiss Serie A, one in the Anglo-Cup and seven were friendly games.

In the 1912–13 season Basel won the Anglo-Cup. However, Bettex did not play in the team that won the final on 29 June 1913 in the Hardau Stadium, Zürich against FC Weissenbühl Bern 5–0.

Sources and References
Rotblau: Jahrbuch Saison 2017/2018. Publisher: FC Basel Marketing AG. 
Verein "Basler Fussballarchiv" Homepage

FC Basel players
Swiss men's footballers
Association football defenders
1892 births
1942 deaths